Arenig Fach is a mountain in southern Snowdonia, north Wales. It is a peak in the Arenig range and lies to the north of its parent peak Arenig Fawr.

It lies close to Llyn Celyn alongside the A4212 between Trawsfynydd and Bala. Carnedd y Filiast and Foel Goch (Arenigs) is to the east, while Moel Llyfnant, Gallt y Daren and Arenig Fawr are to the south.

The summit itself is known as Carnedd Bachgen, named after the ancient cairn, Carnedd y Bachgen (which lies just north-east of the summit), and is the highest point at the north end of a wide plateau. There is a trig point and a substantial shelter cairn. The mountain rises from the Migneint moorland and looks like a bulky heathery "lump" from most directions. However, its north-eastern face has steep cliffs with a small corrie lake, Llyn Arenig Fach, at their bottom. The last glacier occupation of this corrie is thought to have happened during the Loch Lomond Stadial.

References

Marilyns of Wales
Hewitts of Wales
Nuttalls
Mountains and hills of Snowdonia
Mountains and hills of Gwynedd
Llanycil